Lee Wilson Dodd (July 11, 1879 - May 16, 1933) was a playwright, poet, and novelist. Several of his plays were made into films. He also wrote short stories and poems as well as review and he was also a professor.

Dodd was born in Franklin, Pennsylvania. He began his career as a lawyer.

Yale University has a collection of his papers.

Several of his works were published in Harper's Magazine. He had a poem published in Poetry, A Magazine of Verse. In 1919, Dodd's novel The Book of Susan was serialized in the Saturday Evening Post.

Dodd rented a camp at the Pocono Lake Preserve for many years, along with Henry Seidel Canby, before becoming one of the founders of the Yelping Hill Association.

He corresponded with Albert Johannsen.

Dodd is quoted as having written: "Much that I sought, I could not find; much that I found, I could not bind; much that I bound, I could not free; much that I freed, returned to me."

Bibliography
The Book of Susan
His Majesty Bunker Bean, a Comedy in Four Acts and Five Scenes
A Modern Alchemist, and Other Poems (1906)
The Middle Miles and Other Poems
Lilia Chenoworth
The Book of Susan, a Novel (1920)
The Golden Complex: A Defence of Inferiority (1927)
A Garnerof Fugitive Pieces

Plays
The Return of Eve (1909)
Speed (1911)
His Majesty Bunker Bean (1916)
Pals First (1917)
The Changelings (1923)
A Strong Man's House (1929)

Filmography
The Return of Eve (1916), an adaptation of one of Wilson's plays
Pals First, a Wilson play adapted into films in 1918 and 1926
Bunker Bean adapted from Wilson's play that was an adaptation of a Harry Leon Wilson novel
His Majesty, Bunker Bean (1925 film), also an adaptation of a Wilson 1916 play adapted from a Harry Leon Wilson novel

References

External links
Findagrave entry
Lee Wilson Dodd Papers. Yale Collection of American Literature, Beinecke Rare Book and Manuscript Library.

Poets from Pennsylvania
American dramatists and playwrights
1879 births
1933 deaths